Harpendyreus argenteostriata is a butterfly in the family Lycaenidae. It is found in Kivu in the Democratic Republic of the Congo and in Rwanda.

References

Butterflies described in 1961
Harpendyreus